No. 527 Squadron RAF was a radar calibration unit of the Royal Air Force between 1943 and 1958.

History

Formation
No. 527 Squadron was formed from various calibration flights at RAF Castle Camps, Cambridgeshire on 15 June 1943 for radar calibration duties with Bristol Blenheims and Hawker Hurricanes. The squadron was engaged with the calibration of radar stations in southern England and East Anglia. The need for calibration units lessened considerably in 1944, so the squadron absorbed No. 528 Squadron RAF on 1 September 1944, extending its coverage in the process to Lincolnshire, and No. 526 Squadron RAF on 1 May 1945, adding the de Havilland Hornet Moths, Airspeed Oxfords and de Havilland Dominies of these units to its strength. The squadron standardised hereafter on Spitfires, Wellingtons, Oxfords and Dominies, the latter -old aircraft of 526 Squadron- still being based at RAF Longman, Inverness for communications flying. In November 1945, the squadron moved to RAF Watton, Norfolk where it disbanded on 15 April 1946.

Reformation
The squadron reformed on 1 August 1952 at RAF Watton, when the 'N' and 'R' Calibration Squadrons of the Central Signal Establishment were redesignated to No. 527 Squadron. A great variety of types, amongst them Avro Lincolns, Avro Ansons, English Electric Canberras and Gloster Meteors, were flown for high-level calibration until 21 August 1958, when the unit was disbanded by being renumbered to No. 245 Squadron RAF.

Aircraft operated

Squadron bases

References

Notes

Bibliography

External links
 527 Squadron history on MOD site
 Squadron histories for nos. 521–540 sqn on RafWeb's Air of Authority – A History of RAF Organisation

Aircraft squadrons of the Royal Air Force in World War II
527 Squadron
Military units and formations established in 1943
Military units and formations disestablished in 1958